Bootle is a constituency which has been represented in the House of Commons of the UK Parliament since 2015 by Peter Dowd of the Labour Party.

History
From 1885 to 1935, the constituency returned Conservative MPs, with its most notable MP being Conservative Party leader Bonar Law from 1911 to 1918, when property qualifications for the vote were abolished. Bonar Law would later serve as UK Prime Minister from 1922 to 1923, though at that point he no longer represented Bootle in the House of Commons. James Burnie of the Liberal Party held the seat from 1922 to 1924, and the seat was briefly held by John Kinley from the Labour Party from 1929 to 1931 and became a Conservative–Labour marginal seat in the 1930s when the mainstream Labour party formed the National Government. The Labour Party has held it continuously since the 1945 general election; this period saw two decades of steep decline in the profitability of Liverpool Docks, manufacturing and shipbuilding, which employed many constituents. At the three general elections from 1997, Bootle was the safest seat for any party in the United Kingdom by percentage of majority.

In 1990, two by-elections were held in Bootle. The first followed the death of Allan Roberts on 21 February, and was held on 24 May. Jack Holmes, the candidate of the continuing Social Democratic Party (representing the faction of the party which did not merge with the Liberal Democrats) was beaten by Screaming Lord Sutch of the Official Monster Raving Loony Party, contributing to the end of the SDP. The victorious Labour candidate, Michael Carr unexpectedly died on 20 July 1990 after just 57 days in office.

The second by-election, held on 8 November 1990, was won by the Labour candidate, Joe Benton. Benton retained Bootle at the next four general elections with large majorities. At the 2005 general election, the seat was the safest seat by percentage of majority and had the highest winning share of the vote. In June 2014, Benton announced that he would retire at the 2015 general election.

The 2015 result made the seat the fifth-safest of Labour's 232 seats by percentage of majority (with a winning vote share of 74.5% and a majority of 63.6%).

Constituency profile
Though the seat has some small neighbourhoods with middle-to-high incomes, residents generally have some of the lowest UK incomes and there is a higher-than-average proportion of social housing. The Bootle constituency has long been one of the safest seats in the United Kingdom and since 1945, has given a majority of votes cast to the Labour Party at each general election. Since 1964, the size of the majority (by vote share) has been in double digits; since 1992, it has been over 50%, peaking at 74.4% in the 1997 Blair landslide election. However, the Labour vote share was at its highest in 2017, when Peter Dowd received 84% of votes cast. Both the size of the majority and the share of the vote represent an unbeaten record for this constituency.

Boundaries

1885–1918: The Boroughs of Bootle-cum-Linacre and Liverpool, the parishes of Childwall, Fazakerley, Walton-on-the-Hill, and Wavertree, and parts of the parishes of Toxteth Park and West Derby.

1918–1950: The County Borough of Bootle.

1950–1955: The County Borough of Bootle, and the Urban District of Litherland.

1955–1974: As 1918.

1974–1983: As 1950.

1983–1997: The Metropolitan Borough of Sefton wards of Church, Derby, Ford, Linacre, Litherland, Netherton, Orrell, and St Oswald.

1997–2010: As above less Church ward.

2010–present: The Metropolitan Borough of Sefton wards of Church, Derby, Ford, Linacre, Litherland, Netherton and Orrell, St Oswald, and Victoria.

The constituency covers the southern part of the Metropolitan Borough of Sefton in Merseyside. This comprises Bootle itself plus other localities including Crosby, Waterloo, Seaforth, Litherland, Netherton, Orrell and Ford.

Boundary changes that came into force as a result of the 2010 general election being called saw the constituency grow to also include parts of the old Crosby constituency, with the electoral wards of Church and Victoria being added. Although these areas are more affluent than some parts of Bootle, it has not changed the seat from being anything other than a safe Labour one.

Members of Parliament

Elections

Elections in the 2010s

Elections in the 2000s

Elections in the 1990s

Elections in the 1980s

Elections in the 1970s

Elections in the 1960s

Elections in the 1950s

Elections in the 1940s

Elections in the 1930s

Elections in the 1920s

Elections in the 1910s

General Election 1914–15:

Another General Election was required to take place before the end of 1915. The political parties had been making preparations for an election to take place and by July 1914, the following candidates had been selected; 
Unionist: Bonar Law
Liberal:

Elections in the 1900s

Elections in the 1890s

Elections in the 1880s

See also
List of parliamentary constituencies in Merseyside

Notes

References

Sources
Election results, 1950 – 2005
F. W. S. Craig, British Parliamentary Election Results 1885 – 1918
F. W. S. Craig, British Parliamentary Election Results 1918 – 1949

External links 
nomis Constituency Profile for Bootle — presenting data from the ONS annual population survey and other official statistics.

Parliamentary constituencies in North West England
Constituencies of the Parliament of the United Kingdom established in 1885
Politics of the Metropolitan Borough of Sefton
Bootle